Rhus delavayi is a species of plant in the family Anacardiaceae. It is endemic to China.  It is threatened by habitat loss.

References

Flora of China
delavayi
Conservation dependent plants
Taxonomy articles created by Polbot
Taxobox binomials not recognized by IUCN